Leianokladi is a village and a former municipality in Phthiotis, Greece. Since the 2011 local government reform it is part of the municipality Lamia, of which it is a municipal unit. The municipal unit has an area of 80.252 km2. Population 2,186 (2011). The Piraeus–Platy railway line passes through the local train station.

External links
 Municipality of Leianokladi

References

Populated places in Phthiotis